Events in the year 1959 in Japan.

Incumbents 
Emperor: Hirohito
Prime minister: Nobusuke Kishi

Governors
Aichi Prefecture: Mikine Kuwahara 
Akita Prefecture: Yūjirō Obata 
Aomori Prefecture: Iwao Yamazaki 
Chiba Prefecture: Hitoshi Shibata 
Ehime Prefecture: Sadatake Hisamatsu 
Fukui Prefecture: Seiichi Hane (until 22 April); Eizō Kita (starting 23 April)
Fukuoka Prefecture: Taichi Uzaki
Fukushima Prefecture: Zenichiro Satō 
Gifu Prefecture: Yukiyasu Matsuno 
Gunma Prefecture: Toshizo Takekoshi 
Hiroshima Prefecture: Hiroo Ōhara 
Hokkaido: Toshifumi Tanaka (until 22 April); Kingo Machimura (starting 23 April)
Hyogo Prefecture: Masaru Sakamoto 
Ibaraki Prefecture: Yoji Tomosue (until 29 March); Nirō Iwakami (starting 23 April)
Ishikawa Prefecture: Jūjitsu Taya 
Iwate Prefecture: Senichi Abe 
Kagawa Prefecture: Masanori Kaneko 
Kagoshima Prefecture: Katsushi Terazono 
Kanagawa Prefecture: Iwataro Uchiyama 
Kochi Prefecture: Masumi Mizobuchi 
Kumamoto Prefecture: Saburō Sakurai (until 10 February); Kōsaku Teramoto (starting 11 February)
Kyoto Prefecture: Torazō Ninagawa 
Mie Prefecture: Satoru Tanaka 
Miyagi Prefecture: Yasushi Onuma (until 12 January); Yoshio Miura (starting 4 March)
Miyazaki Prefecture: Jingo Futami (until 22 April); Hiroshi Kuroki (starting 23 April)
Nagano Prefecture: Torao Hayashi (until 22 April); Gon'ichirō Nishizawa (starting 26 April)
Nagasaki Prefecture: Katsuya Sato 
Nara Prefecture: Ryozo Okuda 
Niigata Prefecture: Kazuo Kitamura
Oita Prefecture: Kaoru Kinoshita 
Okayama Prefecture: Yukiharu Miki 
Osaka Prefecture: Bunzō Akama (until 22 April); Gisen Satō (starting 23 April)
Saga Prefecture: Naotsugu Nabeshima (until 16 April); Sunao Ikeda (starting 23 April)
Saitama Prefecture: Hiroshi Kurihara 
Shiga Prefecture: Kyujiro Taniguchi 
Shiname Prefecture: Yasuo Tsunematsu (until 29 April); Choemon Tanabe (starting 30 April)
Shizuoka Prefecture: Toshio Saitō 
Tochigi Prefecture: Kiichi Ogawa (until 4 February); Nobuo Yokokawa (starting 5 February)
Tokushima Prefecture: Kikutaro Hara 
Tokyo: Seiichirō Yasui (until 18 April); Ryōtarō Azuma (starting 22 April)
Tottori Prefecture: Jirō Ishiba 
Toyama Prefecture: Minoru Yoshida 
Wakayama Prefecture: Shinji Ono 
Yamagata Prefecture: Tōkichi Abiko 
Yamaguchi Prefecture: Taro Ozawa 
Yamanashi Prefecture: Hisashi Amano

Events
April 1 – Kyoto Ceramic (now Kyocera) has founded.
April 10 – The Crown Prince Akihito, the future Emperor of Japan, weds Michiko Shōda, the first commoner to marry into the Japanese Imperial Family.
June 2 – Mori Building was founded.
June 30 – Twenty-one students are killed and more than a hundred injured when an American North American F-100 Super Sabre jet crashes into Miamori Elementary School on the island of Okinawa. The pilot ejected before the plane struck the school.
July 22 – A Kumamoto University medical research group studying Minamata disease concludes that it is caused by mercury.
September 26 – According to Japanese government official confirmed report, Typhoon Vera with tidal wave hit around Ise Bay, total 5,098 person were lives, 38,921 person were hurt.

Births
January 3 – Dankan, actor and director
January 16 – Kimiko Ikegami, actress
January 17 – Momoe Yamaguchi, actress
February 8 – Amy Yamada, writer
February 20 – Tomomi Inada, politician
March 23 – Kazue Ikura, actress, voice actress and narrator
May 19 – Michiru Shimada, screenwriter (d. 2017)
May 23 – Ryuta Kawashima, neuroscientist
June 17 – Kazuki Yao, voice actor and actor
July 17 – Kiyotaka Sugiyama, singer-songwriter 
August 17 – Chika Sakamoto, voice actress
October 13 – Denny Tamaki, governor of Okinawa Prefecture
October 21 – Ken Watanabe, actor
November 21 – Naoko Watanabe, voice actress
November 24 – Akio Ōtsuka, actor and voice actress
December 5 – Yoshitomo Nara, artist
December 6 – Satoru Iwata, video game designer, businessman (d. 2015)

Deaths
March 7 – Ichirō Hatoyama, politician and 35th Prime Minister of Japan (b. 1883)
April 30 – Kafū Nagai, author, playwright, essayist, and diarist (b. 1879)
June 20 – Hitoshi Ashida, politician and 35th Prime Minister of Japan (b. 1887)

References

 
1950s in Japan
Japan
Years of the 20th century in Japan